Aix-sur-Cloie is a village of Wallonia in the municipality of Aubange, district of Halanzy, located in the province of Luxembourg, Belgium.

A bronze bracelet from the fourth century BC found in Aix-sur-Cloie and currently in the archaeological museum in Arlon indicates that there has been a settlement in the area since prehistoric times. Today the village contains several buildings from the 18th century, as well as several calvary sculptures.

References

External links

Populated places in Luxembourg (Belgium)